Phyllis Arkle (Chester, 23 April 1910 – 10 October 1997), was an English author of children's books.

She was born and educated in Chester, but 1959 saw her move to the village of Twyford, Berkshire. Among her works was The Railway Cat (1983) and the Roddy the Roadman series (beginning in 1970).

Personal life 
Phyllis Griffiths married Edward Arkle. She died in 1997, aged 87 years.

Bibliography
Roddy the Roadman (1970)

Roddy and the Rustlers (1972)

Magic at Midnight (1974)

Roddy on the Motorway (1974)

Roddy on the Canal (1975)

Grandma's Own Zoo (1979)

Roddy and the Puma (1979)

The Village Dinosaur (1979)

The Adventures of Blunter Button (1980)

Magic in the Air (1980)

Roddy and the Miniature Railway (1980)

Two Village Dinosaurs (1981)

The Railway Cat (1985)

The Real Sawrey (1985)

The Railway Cat and Digby (1986)

The Railway Cat's Secret (1987)

The Dinosaur Field (1989)

The Railway Cat on the Run (1996)

The Railway Cat and the Ghost (1997)

The Railway Cat and the Horse (1999)

References

1910 births
1997 deaths
English children's writers
People from Chester
People from Twyford, Berkshire
British women children's writers
20th-century English women writers
20th-century English writers